Hartley House may refer to:

 Hartley House, Palm Harbor, Florida, home of the North Pinellas Historical Museum
 Hartley Farms, Morristown, New Jersey, listed on the National Register of Historic Places
 Hartley House Settlement, community center in New York City
 Bollinger-Hartley House, Blowing Rock, North Carolina, listed on the National Register of Historic Places
 Orrin B. Hartley House, Hood River, Oregon
 Hartley House (Batesburg, South Carolina)
 Hartley House (Batesburg-Leesville, South Carolina), also known as the Bond-Bates-Hartley House
 Hartley House (Houston, Texas), listed on the National Register of Historic Placees
 Roland Hartley House, Everett, Washington

See also
Hartley (disambiguation)